Mahabharat is a 2013 Indian historical epic television series based on the Sanskrit saga Mahabharata. It aired from 16 September 2013 to 16 August 2014 on Star Plus. The series is available digitally on Disney+ Hotstar. Produced by Swastik Productions Pvt. Ltd, it starred Saurabh Raj Jain, Pooja Sharma, Shaheer Sheikh and Aham Sharma.

Plot
The story begins with Bhishma, the son of Shantanu and Ganga, taking his oath of celibacy to convince Satyavati to marry his father Shantanu, the king of Hastinapura. Shantanu and Satyavati marry and have 2 children - Chitrangada and Vichitravirya. Chitrangad dies and on the advice of queen Saytavati Bhisma wins the three princesses of Kashi kingdom for Vichitravirya but the eldest Princess Amba refuses to marry him and leaves for her lover who rejects her. She blames Bhisma and vows that she will be the reason of his death.  Vichitravirya died without any children, but Veda Vyasa, the son of Satyavati born through occult is requested to impregnate Vichitravirya's 2 wives Ambika and Ambalika the same way he was conceived. Besides the queens, Vyasa also impregnates a maid Parishrami through occult. Soon, Ambika gives birth to Dhritarashtra, born blind, Ambalika gives birth to Pandu, born pale and Parashrami gives birth to Vidura.

25 years later 
Dhritarashtra is married to Gandhari, the princess of Gandhara Kingdom; because of her boon of bearing a hundred sons. After knowing her would-be-husband is blind Gandhari decided to blindfold herself to share her husband's pain. This angers Shakuni, the brother of Gandhari, and he vows to destroy Bhishma, as it was him who had brought the proposal for Gandhari's marriage. Dhritarashtra is denied the throne for being blind, and the throne is given to Pandu. Pandu marries Kunti, a princess of Kunti Kingdom, and Madri of Madra Kingdom. Pandu is later cursed by Sage Kindama, that he will die if he attempts to impregnate his wives. Pandu, heartbroken, renounces the kingdom with his 2 wives. After this Dhritarashtra becomes de facto king of Hastinapur.

Kunti uses her boon, given to her by Sage Durvasa, to invoke gods of her choice and obtain children from them. She begets Yudhishthira from Yama (the god of death and righteousness), Bhima from Vayu (the god of wind), Arjuna from Indra (the king of the gods). She also chants the boon for Madri, and Madri obtains twins - Nakula and Sahadeva - from the Ashwini Kumaras. Gandhari is jealous by this development and gives birth to a lump of flesh after being pregnant for 2 years, but this is cut into 101 pieces by Veda Vyasa, and these pieces eventually transform into children - the 100 Kauravas (led by Duryodhana) and a daughter, Dushala.

15 years later 
Years pass, and the Kauravas grow up to be evil, led by their eldest brother Duryodhana, who is highly influenced by his uncle Shakuni, contrary to the Pandavas who are righteous. Pandavas return to Hastinapur with Kunti, after the death of Pandu and Madri. Shakuni tries to poison Bheema, but he is saved by his great-grandfather Naag Raj. Bhishma banishes Shakuni from Hastinapur, forcing him to return to Gandhar. All princes are sent to study under Guru Dronacharya where Dronacharya teaches everyone about warfare including his son Ashwatthama.

12 years later 
Years pass and the princes return to Hastinapur, where they are engaged in a competition of showcasing their skills. Arjuna wins the competition, but Karna challenges Arjuna as Dronacharya declared Arjuna as the greatest bowman of the world. Kunti realises that Karna is her son whom she had obtained from Surya, the Sun God, long before marriage. In the meantime, Arjuna, also befriends Lord Krishna, his cousin (Lord Krishna's father was Vasudev, brother of Kunti), and King of Dwarka. The Kauravas attempt to kill the Pandavas using a palace made of wax, but the Pandavas escape. They go into exile so all others believe them to be dead. In the process, the Pandavas encounter a demon by the name Hidimba. Bhima kills Hidimba but ends up marrying his sister, Hidimbi. The couple begets a son, Ghatotkacha.  Arjune disguised as a Brahmin wins Draupadi in her Swayamvar arranged by her father, the King of Panchal, Drupad. Arjuna takes her to his mother who was doing Pooja and without realising what he was talking about commands him to share whatever he has won with his brothers. The Pandavas eventually marry Draupadi, the princess of Panchala and King Drupada's daughter, born from fire, thus revealing their identity. They return to Hastinapur and justify their polyandry.

The sequence of events leads to the Kuru Kingdom being divided - The Pandavas receive a new kingdom - Khandavprastha. Arjuna destroys the Khandava. They renovate the town, and rename it as Indraprastha. The prosperity of Indraprastha angers Duryodhana. A jealous Duryodhana summons Pandavas for a dice game, where Yudhishthira loses his kingdom, brothers as well as their common wife Draupadi. Draupadi is dragged and humiliated in the court, however, Krishna saves her honour at the end.

The Pandavas and Draupadi, as a result of losing, are forced into a 12-year exile and a year of incognito, the latter phase being spent in the kingdom of King Virata. Pandavas reunite with their children- the Upapandavas (the 5 sons of Draupadi) and Abhimanyu (the son of Arjuna and Subhadra), after the exile period. Abhimanyu is married to Uttaraa, the daughter of King Virata and Queen Sudeshna.

The Pandavas' peace treaty with the Kauravas fails to materialise, thus confirming that a war is set to happen. Both, the Pandavas and Kauravas, gather their respective armies by allying with different tribes and kingdoms.

Shortly before the Kurukshetra War commences, Arjuna obtains the knowledge of the Bhagavad Gita from Krishna, which helps him fight for righteousness without any remorse of killing his own people in the process. The war begins and continues for 18 days - both sides face mass destruction. The Pandavas and Kauravas lose all of their children, in-laws, and allies, and the war officially ends after Duryodhana, the only remaining Kaurava, is killed by Bhima.

Ashwatthama (the son of Dronacharya), on seeing Duryodhana's death, gets angered and raids the Pandava camp at night, killing many soldiers in the process. Dhrishtadyumna, Shikhandini ( eldest sister of Draupadi who helped Pandavas in killing Bhishma) and the Upapandavas are killed by Ashwatthama while they are sleeping. He also tries to kill a widowed Uttaraa and her unborn baby rather unsuccessfully, but both of them are revived and the child is named as 'Parikshit' by Krishna.

Krishna also curses Ashwatthama to remain in severe pain and immortality for the rest of his life because of his heinous act. The Pandavas return to Hastinapura, where Dhritarashtra attempts to kill Bhima but ends up being unsuccessful. Gandhari curses Krishna for letting the war happen as she lost all of her sons and grandsons, so he suffers the same fate. The show ends with Yudhishthira being finally crowned by Krishna, as the king of Hastinapur.

Cast

Main 
 Saurabh Raaj Jain as Krishna/Vishnu: Devaki and Vasudev's son; Yashoda and Nanda's foster son; Balram and Subhadra's half brother; Kunti's nephew; Radha's lover; Rukmini's husband; Karna and the Pandavas’s cousin; Draupadi's friend. He is an incarnation of Lord Vishnu, who came to earth to protect dharma.
Shaheer Sheikh as Arjuna: Third Pandava prince; Supreme  archer; Pandu and Kunti's son; Indra's spiritual son; Madri's step-son; Karna, Yudhishthir, Bheem's younger brother; Nakul and Sahadev's half elder brother; Draupadi, Ulupi, Chitrangada and Subhadra's husband; Shrutakarma, Iravan, Babruvahana, Abhimanyu, Pragati and Pragya's father; Uttarā's teacher and father in law; Parikshit's grandfather.
Pooja Sharma as Draupadi: Princess of Panchal; King Drupad and Kokila's(Asha) fire born daughter; Shikhandini and Dhristadyumna's younger sister; Pandavas's common wife; Mother of Upapandavas, Suthanu, Samyukthana, Pragati, Pragya, Printha and Sumithra's mother.
Aham Sharma as Karna: King of Anga; The supreme archer; Surya and Kunti's son; Vrushali's husband; Pandavas's elder brother; Adhiratha and Radha's foster son; Duryodhan's friend. 
Arpit Ranka as Duryodhan: Eldest Kaurava; King Dhritarashtra and Queen Gandhari's first son;  Bhanumati's husband; Shakuni's nephew; Lakshmana and Lakshmanaā's father; Karna and Ashwathama's friend. An arrogant and hotheaded crown prince of Hastinapur, he is often manipulated by his maternal uncle Shakuni, an excellent mace fighter. Killed by Bheema on the 18th day.
Praneet Bhat as Shakuni: King Subala and Queen Sudharma's son; Gandhari's elder brother; Arshi's husband; Uluka, Vrikasura and Patatatri's father. In beginning, he is a prince but later King of Gandhara. He is devious and strategised all plans of Duryodhan against Pandavas. He has grudge against Bhishma for marrying his sister Gandhari to Dhritarashtra. Killed by Sahadeva on the 18th day.
Arav Chowdhary as Bhishma: King Shantanu and Goddess Ganga's son and Grandsire of Pandavas and Kauravas. He had taken a pledge of celibacy and was given a boon by his father to decide the timing of death. Defeated by Arjuna on the 10th day.
Thakur Anoop Singh as Dhritarashtra: Blind King of Hastinapur. He is born from Vyasa and Ambika's niyoga; Pandu and Vidura's elder brother; Gandhari's husband, Kauravas and Dushala's father, Pandavas paternal uncle. He is deeply insecure and intensely partial to his sons which often prevents him from making wise decisions.
Riya Deepsi as Gandhari: King Subala and Queen Sudharma's daughter; Princess of Gandhara; Shakuni's younger sister; Dhritarashtra's wife; Kauravs and Dushala's mother. After knowing that her future husband is born blind she decided to blindfold herself to share the pain of her husband. After her husband's coronation, she became queen of Hastinapur. 
Shafaq Naaz as Kunti: Dowager Queen of Hastinapur; King Pandu's first wife. Karna, Yudhisthir, Bhim and Arjun's mother; Nakul and Sahadev's step mother; Shurasena's daughter; Kuntibhoj's foster daughter; Vasudev's sister; Balarama, Krishna, and Subhadra's paternal aunt. She has the power to have a child by invoking God.
Rohit Bhardwaj as Yudhishthira: First Pandava Prince; A truthful King. He ruled Indraprastha and later Hastinapur; Pandu and Kunti's son; Dharmaraj spiritual son; Madri's step-son; Karna's younger brother; Bheem and Arjun's elder brother; Nakul and Sahadev's half elder brother; Draupadi and Devika's husband; Prativindhya, Yaudheya and Suthanu's father.  
Saurav Gurjar as Bhima: Second Pandava Prince; a tremendous mace fighter Pandu and Kunti's son; Vayu's spiritual son; Karna, Yudhishthir's younger brother; Arjun's elder brother; Nakul and Sahadev's half elder brother; Hidimbi, Draupadi and Valandhara's huasband; Ghatothkacha, Sutasoma, Sarvaga and Samyukthana's father.
Nissar Khan as Drona: Sage Bharadwaja's son, Royal teacher of Kuru princes, Kripi's husband, Ashwatthama father. Killed by Drishtadhyumna on Day 15 of the Kurukshetra war.
Ankit Mohan as Ashwatthama: Drona and Kripi's son; Duryodhan friend.
Vin Rana as Nakula: Fourth Pandava Prince; Pandu and Madri's son; Ashwini Kumar Nastya's spiritual son; Kunti's step&foster son; Sahadev's twin elder brother;  Karna, Yudhishthir, Bheem and Arjun's half younger brother; Draupadi and Karenumati's husband; Shatanika, Niramitra and Printha's father.
Lavanya Bhardwaj as Sahadeva: Fifth Pandava Prince; Pandu and Madri's son; Ashwini Kumar Darsa's spiritual son; Kunti's step&foster son; Nakul's twin younger brother; Karna, Yudhishthir, Bheem and Arjun's half younger brother; Draupadi and Vijaya's husband; Shrutasena, Suhotra and Sumithra's father.
Nirbhay Wadhwa as Dushasana: Second Kaurava, King Dhritarashtra and Queen Gandhari's second son, Duryodhana's younger brother, 98 Kauravas and Dushala's elder brother, Killed by Bheema on the 17th day.

Recurring 
Sayantani Ghosh as Satyavati: A fisherwoman who married King Shantanu and became Queen. Ved Vyasa, Chitragada, and Vichitravirya's mother. Bhishma's step-mother.
Naveen Jinger as Vidura: Prime minister of Hastinapur, Vyasa and Ambika and Ambalika's maid's Parishrami son, Dhritarashtra and Pandu's younger brother, Sulabha's husband.
Sudesh Berry as Drupada: King of Panchala and Shikhandini, Dhristadyumna and Draupadi's father. 
Berry also portrayed as King Pratipa: father of King Shantanu, Devapi and Bahlika
Karan Suchak as Dhrishtadyumna: King Drupad's fire born son, Shikhandini's younger brother and Draupadi's elder brother and Prince of Panchala, Kshatradharman, Kshatravarman, Kshatranjaya, and Dhrishtaketu's father.
Shikha Singh as Shikhandini/Shikhandi: King Drupad and Queen Kokila's daughter; Satyajit, Dhrishtadyumna and Draupadi's elder sister; Princess of Panchala and Amba's rebirth.
Paras Arora as Abhimanyu: Arjun and Subhadra's son; Uttarā's husband and Parikshit's father. A brave and young warrior killed by Kauravas through treachery
Veebha Anand as Subhadra/Yogmaya: Vasudeva and Rohini's daughter, Balram and Krishna's younger sister, Arjun's fourth wife. Abhimanyu's mother; Parikshit's grandmother
Hemant Choudhary as Kripa: Kul Guru of Hastinapur; Astra Guru of Kauravas and Pandavas; Kripi’s brother and Drona’s brother-in-law
Sandeep Arora as Vikarna: Third Kaurava prince, King Dhritarashtra and Queen Gandhari's third son and Duryodhan and Dushasna's younger brother, Dushyala's elder brother and Indumati's husband.
 Abhianshu Vohra as King Susharma :Brother of Bhanumati ( Duryodhan Wife ) 
Nazea Hasan Sayed as Vrushali: Karna's Wife. 
Kaushik Chakravorty as Shalya: King of Madra and Madri's elder brother.
Ajay Mishra as Sanjaya: Dhritarashtra's advisor and charioteer.
Atul Mishra as Ved Vyas: Satyavati and Maharishi Parashara's son and Dhritarashtra, Pandu and Vidura's surrogate father. Mahabharata's author
Arun Singh Rana as Pandu: Ambalika and Vyasa's son, Kunti and Madri's husband, father of the Pandavas, the King of Hastinapur.
Ali Hassan as Jayadratha: King Brihanmanas's son and later King of Sindhu Kingdom, Dushala's husband, and Suratha's father.
Hassan also portrayed Takshak: Nagraj and Ruler of Takshila who killed Arjuna's grandson Parikshit.
Vaishnavi Dhanraj as Hidimbā: Bheem's first wife and Ghatothkacha's mother.
Ketan Karande as Ghatotkacha: Bheema and Himdimbā's son, who was killed by Karna.
Tarun Khanna as Balrama: Rohini and Vasudev's son, Subhadra's elder brother and Krishna's step elder brother.
Deepak Jethi as Virata: Matsya's king, Sudeshna's husband, and Uttar and Uttara's father.
Mallika Nayak as Sudeshna: Matsya's Queen, Virata's wife, Uttara, and Uttar's Mother.
Rumi Khan as Kichaka: Commander-in-chief of Matsya, Sudeshna's brother and Uttar and Uttara's maternal uncle.
Joy Mathur as Shishupala: Krishna's cousin and Duryodhana's friend.
Richa Mukherjee as Uttarā: King Virata and Queen Sudeshna's daughter, Uttar's younger sister, Abhimanyu's wife, and Parikshit's mother.
Pravisht Mishra as Uttar: Virata and Sudeshna's son and Uttara's brother. He was killed by Shalya on first day of war.
Puneet Issar as Parashurama: The sixth avatar of Lord Vishnu and the teacher of Bhishma, Drona, and Karna
Sameer Dharmadhikari as Shantanu: King of Hastinapur, Pratipa and Sunanda's son, Ganga and Satyavati's husband and Bhishma, Chitrangada and Vichtravirya's father.
Vivana Singh as Devi Ganga: River goddess of Purity, King Shantanu's first wife, and Bhishma's mother.
Aryamann Seth as Vichitravirya: King Shantanu and Queen Satyavati's son, Chitrangad's younger brother, and Ambika and Ambalika's husband.
Ratan Rajput as Amba: Kashya's daughter, Ambika and Ambalika's elder sister and the Princess of Kashi
Aparna Dixit as Ambika: Vichitravirya's first wife and Dhritarashtra's mother.
Mansi Sharma as Ambalika: Vichitravirya's second wife and Pandu's mother.
Suhani Dhanki as Madri: Princess of Madra and King Pandu's second wife and Nakul and Sahadev's mother.
Rio Kapadia as Subala: King of Gandhar, Sudharma's husband and Shakuni and Gandhari's father.
Shweta Gautam as Sudharma: Queen of Gandhar, Subala's wife and Shakuni and Gandhari's mother.
Ananya Agarwal as Malini: Draupadi's little friend.
Anju Jadhav as Sugadha: Gandhari's maid and Yuyutsu's mother.
Jayantika Sengupta as Arshi: Shakuni's wife.
Manish Bishla as Yuyutsu: Dhritarashtra and Sugadha’s son, Duryodhana’s younger step brother and other Kauravas’s elder step brother, fought for Pandavas and remained alive.
Bhakti Chauhan as Priyamvada: Kunti's childhood friend like maid. The only person who knows Karna's secret from beginning
Kanishka Soni as Sulabha: Vidura's wife.
Ketaki Kadam as Radha: Krishna's divine consort.
Chandni Sharma as Kripi: Drona's wife, Ashwathama's mother, and Kripa's twin sister.
Garima Jain as Dushala: King Dhritarashtra and Queen Gandhari's daughter, Pandavas and Kauravas' sister, Jayadrath's wife and Suratha's mother.
Preeti Puri as Devaki: Vasudev's wife, Kansa's sister, and Krishna's mother.
Vandana Singh as Yashoda: Krishna's foster mother.
Pallavi Subhash as Rukmini: Princess of Vidharbha, Rukmi's younger sister and Krishna's first wife.
Gurpreet Singh ad Rukmi: Prince of Vidharbha and Rukmini's brother.
Akhilendra Mishra as Kansa: Devaki's elder brother and Krishna's maternal uncle.
Tinu Verma as Jarasandha: King of Magadha. He is defeated by Karna and is killed by Bheem.
Raj Premi as Kalayavan: A demon king who was fetched to death by Lord Krishna.
Niel Satpuda as Prativindhya: Yudhishthira and Draupadi's son and the Eldest Upapandava.
Aman Sharma as Sutasoma:  Bheema and Draupadi's son.
Yash Joshi as Shrutakarma: Arjuna and Draupadi's son.
Jay Joshi as Shatanika: Nakula and Draupadi's son.
Akshay Batchua as Shrutasena: Sahadeva and Draupadi's son.
Yagya Saxena as Eklavya: A devoted student of Drona who gives away his thumb as Guru Dakshina. 
Mohit Raina / Amit Mehra as Lord Shiva: Known as the 'destroyer', a part of the Trinity;Supreme Being
Sachin Verma / Nikhil Arya as Lord Indra: God of rain, King of the Gods and Heaven, and Bali and Arjuna's father.
Sandeep Rajora as Lord Surya: Lord Sun and Sugriva and Karna's father.
Kunal Bhatia as Lord Agni: God of fire. Drishtadyumna and Draupadi's father
Vishal Kotian as Lord Hanuman: Rama's devotee, Vayu's son, and Bheema's elder spiritual brother.
Vidyut Xavier as adolescent Karna.
Vedant Sawant as adolescent Balarama.
Kunwar Vikram Soni as young Shri Krishna.
Rohit Shetty as young Yudhishthira.
Miraj Joshi as young Bhima.
Soumya Singh as young Arjuna.
Devish Ahuja as young Nakula.
Rudraksh Jaiswal as young Sahadeva. 
Alam Khan as young Duryodhana. 

Ashnoor Kaur as young Dushala. 
Aayush Shah as young Ashwatthama.
Raj Anadkat as young Vikarna (Third eldest brother among the 100 Kauravas).

Production

Background
In November 2005, a report from Variety stated Bobby Bedi's plan to make three feature films and 100 hours of television programming on Indian epic Mahabharat under Kaleidoscope Entertainment with the television version planned to be delivered by the end of 2007. In 2006 it was revealed making for Star Plus which was to be directed by Chandraprakash Dwivedi. It was a part of Bedi's 360 degree approach to the epic through TV, film, gaming and theme parks. Planned for 100 episodes with new actors, it was planned to premiere in March 2008 but got postpone due to production to August 2008 and later January 2009.

During this, Ekta Kapoor was simultaneously producing a series on Mahabharat since January 2008 titled Kahaani Hamaarey Mahaabhaarat Ki for a rival channel to premiere in mid 2008 which she earlier planned for Star but could not as the channel roped Bedi. This led on to a pressure in the production as they wanted to rush their premiere before Kapoor due to which Dwivedi quit midway after association with them for two years after which three directors were working on it. But, they were not able to rush up the series before Kapoor's. 50 episodes were shot at the sets created in Morna between Noida and Delhi for a year after paying ₹6 Crores.  However, as the channel was not satisfied with those episodes, they were asked to rework the entire series again pushing its premiere to 2009. But, Bedi reportedly started selling it in DVDs which created problems between them and the channel, and the production was stalled. However, in December 2008, Star took Bedi to Bombay High Court filing an arbitration petition alleging that the production house took ₹6 Crore for the production of the series in advance but has not produced even a single episode while a senior executive from the production house stated, " This legal notice is Star's way of pulling out of the show. Maybe it doesn't want to go ahead with the Mahabharat project after all." After these, the shooting was expected to restart from February 2009 but in mid 2009 the production was cancelled and the project was given over to Siddharth Kumar Tewary's Swastik Productions to start fresh.

Development

More than 400 people were involved in production with 200 people working on graphics. Renowned author Devdutt Pattanaik was roped as the chief consultant and guiding person for the series.  Also writer Salim Khan, music directors Ajay-Atul and Ismail Darbar and action director Ram Shetty were involved.

Speaking about bringing Mahabharat to television again, Star Plus senior vice-president Nikhil Madhok said, "With over 20 years having passed since the telecast of Mahabharat serial on Doordarshan, we felt that the younger generation should be re-introduced to this epic. Also, the plot of this epic is open to interpretation and has many intricacies in it, unlike that of let's say Ramayan, which is fairly linear and is passed on from generation to generation."

According to producer Siddharth Kumar Tewary, the Draupadi cheer haran (disrobing) sequence, which Tewary himself directed, took 20 days to shoot.

Even in the last fight between Bheema and Duryodhana, the actors shared that the scene took 3 days to shoot.

Originally planned for 129 episodes, its growing popularity gave an extension for about 100 more episodes as Tewary wanted to explore the story further in January 2014. However, it ended with 267 episodes.

Design
The set covering 10 acres of land in Umargam, Valsad, Gujarat was designed by the art director Omung Kumar.

The costume designer of the series Nidhi Yasha along with her consultant Bhanu Athaiya, had referred 450 books related to period textiles, costume and jewellery.

Marketing and budget
Star spent  on the project and spent another  on marketing the show, making it India's most expensive TV series. As a part of marketing, Star constructed Mahabharat museum across malls in cities consisting selective weapons, jewellery and finery of Mahabharat along with 3D virtual tour of the sets of Hastinapur. In towns the same concept was adapted with wheels-canter vans along with LED.

The sets of the series at Umargam in Gujarat cost ₹100 crores and production costs of ₹13-15 Lakhs per day.

Filming
The series was mainly shot in the sets at Umargam, Valsad in Gujarat. Shooting also took place in various exotic locations such as Jaisalmer, Amber Palace in Jaipur, Kashmir, Ahmedabad, Jabalpur in Madhya Pradesh, Nepal and Sri Lanka.

Training
The actors shared that they had to go through acting workshops and various trainings for about a year where they were explained in detail what to do and how. Rajit Kapur trained the actors by conducting acting workshops.

Soundtrack

Reception

Critics
Writing for Rediff, Nishi Tiwari wrote that "If it maintains the quality of writing and able actors who portray key characters, we may have another winner among us". DNA praised the costumes, scenery, Krishna's flute theme which was given by Raj Mohan Sinha, and most of the CGI special effects, but said the serial's pace was too fast.

Hindustan Times criticised, "Everything is so exaggerated that you feel you are watching a series of unreal events rather than following a deeply emotional story. Even relatively less important moments are treated with such overblown drama that when you really need the drama at crucial junctures — such as Bheeshma’s brahmacharya pledge — the impact is lost." The background music was also criticised for being loud all the time.

Viewership in India
Its premiere had a viewership of approximately 8.4 million impressions (8.445 TVTs - Television Viewership in Thousands) and 4.09 TVR. That week it averaged 6.356 TVTs. The viewership ratings of the week of 1 December 2013 reached 9.801 TVTs. The game of dice leading to Draupadi's 'cheer haran' took Mahabharat at its peak viewership (10 TVMs) and helped the broadcasting channel Star Plus clock one of the highest GTVMs. Overall, it became the tenth most watched Hindi GEC of 2013 with an average viewership of 5.6 million and a peak viewership of 7.2 million.

In week 29 of 2014, it was at fifth position with 7.1 TVTs while the following week it jumped to second position with 9.2 TVTs.

The show was listed in the list of top 20 TV series of all time in 2016.

During the COVID-19 outbreak and lockdown in India, it started re-airing on Star Plus from 30 March 2020 to 25 July 2020. It soon became one of the most-watched Hindi GEC series featuring in the top five programs even during the re-run.

Impact
This series is regarded as the costliest show ever launched by StarPlus and one of the costliest Indian television series, being the first Indian television show to be made on a budget more than ₹100 crores.

In 2014, the cast of Mahabharat were invited to hold a fan meeting tour at Jakarta and Bali. The Times of India reported that the show has a huge fan following abroad and as result, the prominent characters from the show had been called to Indonesia for a special event. The main casts of Mahabharat, performed on "Mahabharat Show: Fan Meeting Tour" in the year 2014 .

In June 2020, Karnataka Chief Minister Yediyurappa then, on watching the Kannada dubbed version appreciated the series and stated that the character Krishna played by Saurabh Raj Jain impressed him and also stated that just like every Mahabharata.

Awards and nominations 
It won the trophy for the Best Drama in Star Guild Awards 2013 as well as number of accolades in other award shows. Show won Best Historical/Mythological serial award in Indian Television Academy Awards. It won the Indian Telly Awards for  Actor in a Supporting Role (Drama), given to Aham Sharma for his portrayal as Karna, and Actor in a Negative Role to Praneet Bhat in 2014. The crew members also won the awards for Best Costumes for a TV Programme, Best Make – Up Artist, and Best Stylist.

References

External links

Official Website on Hotstar

StarPlus original programming
2013 Indian television series debuts
2014 Indian television series endings
Television series based on Mahabharata
Television shows based on poems
Swastik Productions television series